UL Bohemian RFC is a rugby club based in Limerick, playing in Division 2A of the All-Ireland League. It is affiliated with the University of Limerick. UL Bohemians are sponsored by UL Sport, Samurai Sports and HOMS Solicitors. The symbol of the club is the Red Robin

Bohemians field four men's (1XV, 2XV, 3XV, U20's) and two women's senior teams along with youth and mini rugby teams from U6's - U19's, and play their home matches at Annacotty, the University's North Campus 4G pitches and Thomond Park.

History
The Bohemian RFC was founded in 1922 and amalgamated with the University of Limerick in 1999, although the University has its own separate colleges competition teams.

Academy

The UL Bohemians Rugby Academy was first established in 2000 and is based on the University of Limerick’s sporting campus. The UL Bohs Rugby Academy avails of UL’s world class training facilities to provide a pathway for players to achieve their rugby goals, whether that is to play senior, provincial or international rugby.

The UL Bohemians Academy has an outstanding record for producing exceptional talent. Tommy O'Donnell, JJ Hanrahan, Dave Kilcoyne and Dave Foley are all academy graduates currently playing at the highest level. Former Connacht player Keith Matthews is academy manager and Cathal Sheridan is academy sports psychologist.

Notable players
Tommy O'Donnell
Jack O'Donoghue
JJ Hanrahan
Cathal Sheridan 
Dave Kilcoyne
Dave Foley
Sean Henry
Barry Murphy
Brian Spillane

References

 
Irish rugby union teams
Rugby union clubs in County Limerick
Rugby clubs established in 1999
University and college rugby union clubs in Ireland
Bohs
Senior Irish rugby clubs (Munster)
Rugby union clubs in Limerick (city)
1999 establishments in Ireland